The Winburndale Rivulet is a river of the state of New South Wales in Australia. It begins at the junction of the Kirkconnell and Mitchells Creeks to the West of Sunny Corner and flows in a westerly direction until it meets the Macquarie River to the East of Killongbutta.

It is dammed to the East of Bathurst by Winburndale Dam.

See also
List of rivers of Australia

References

Rivers of New South Wales